Educational aim is a goal of the educational experience or process. This page lists the generic educational aims which one might encounter in educational theory, research or practice, including new concepts in published literature. The discussion and study of educational aims are usually found in philosophy of education, educational theories, and through practical policy making.

 Knowledge
 Descriptive knowledge
 Procedural knowledge
 Wisdom
 Skills
 Higher order thinking skills
 Numeracy
 Reasoning
 21st century skills
 Creativity
 Metacognition
 Life skills
 Study skills
 Critical thinking
 Literacy
 Cultural literacy
 Diaspora literacy
 Faith literacy
 Digital literacy
 Computer literacy
 Transliteracy
 Technological literacy
 Web literacy
 Information and media literacy
 Data literacy
 Information literacy
 Media literacy
 Scientific literacy
 Statistical literacy
 Visual literacy
 Information literacies
 Agricultural literacy
 Carbon literacy
 Ecological literacy
 Emotional literacy
 Geo-literacy
 Health literacy
 Mental health literacy
 Legal literacy
 Oracy
 Power literacy
 Critical literacy
 Racial literacy
 Financial literacy
 Musical literacy
 Disposition
 Attitudes
 Discipline
 Social-emotional skills
 Interpersonal relationship
 Self-awareness
 Social consciousness
 Emotional self-regulation
 Self-directed beliefs
 Academic self-concept
 Academic self-efficacy
 Self-esteem
 Motivation
 Bildung
 Educational equity
 Educational inequality

 Peace
 Reconciliation
 Economic growth
 Sustainable development
 Justice

See also

Outline of education

Outlines of education
Curricula
state=collapse